The First Trolleybus is a 1963 Soviet romance film directed by Isidor Annensky.

Plot 
The film tells about a beautiful trolleybus driver named Svetlana, who enchants all the young people who ride the trolleybus. She had to quit her job in order to go to college, but having entered there, she realized that she lacked the attention of those guys and she decided to study in absentia and again became a trolleybus driver.

Cast 
 Irina Gubanova as Sveta Soboleva
 Lev Sverdlin as Sveta's Father
 Nina Sazonova as Maria Ignatyevna (as N. Sazonova)
 Aleksandr Demyanenko as Sergei
 Dalvin Shcherbakov as Pavel
 Evgeniy Anufriyev as Vasya
 Oleg Dahl as Senya
 Viktor Bortsov as Kiryushin
 Nina Doroshina as Dasha

References

External links 
 

1963 films
1960s Russian-language films
Soviet romance films
1960s romance films
Soviet black-and-white films
Soviet teen films